Dionisio D. Martinez (born 7 April 1956), is a Cuban-born poet who grew up speaking Spanish, raised first in Spain, then in the United States.

His work appeared in American Poetry Review, Denver Quarterly, Georgia Review, Iowa Review, Kenyon Review, New Republic, Poetry, Prairie Schooner, Virginia Quarterly Review.

He lives in Tampa, Florida.

Awards
 1993 Whiting Award
 1997 National Endowment for the Arts Fellowship
 1998 Guggenheim Fellowship
 1999 National Poetry Series, for Climbing Back

Works

Books
  (chapbook)

Poems
"Belated Valentine for Alina", Virginia Quarterly Review, Winter 1995 
"Rest before you sleep", Poetry (September 2008)
"Tipping over the actuarial tables", Poetry Foundation

See also
 Cuban American literature
 List of Cuban-American writers

References

External links
Profile at The Whiting Foundation

1956 births
Cuban male poets
Living people